"Night Air" is a song by British singer Jamie Woon released as the lead single from his debut album, Mirrorwriting.

Background
Woon described finishing the song as one of the highlights of the album-making process:
[...] I put the bass on Night Air, off this Casio keyboard my mate found in a skip. It just had this real gnarly, smooth, glidy bass. It was really nice to find a way of injecting weight into the tune without it being aggressive, that was exciting. That locked that track together. It was the first track where the mood and the sentiment fitted with the sound of the song, it was working as a whole.

Critical reception
David Drake from Pitchfork noted the song for being "impeccably crafted", recreating the nocturnal elements, which render the listener a "lonely midnight victim of fever or desire". He added that the "powerful" track's "exotic sexuality" is highlighted by Woon's vocals and seduction. The Observer reviewer Kitty Empire called the track "otherworldly magic" and "dark". NME described it as "antsily infectious, scratchy and edgy".

Formats and track listings
EP
"Night Air" — 5:23
"Night Air" (Ramadanman Refix) — 7:11
"Night Air" (Becoming Real Remix) — 3:49
"Night Air" (Blue Daisy Mixture) — 6:49

12" vinyl
"Night Air" — 5:23
"Night Air" (Ramadanman Refix) — 7:11

Credits and personnel
Main vocals – Jamie Woon
Design, artwork – Duncan Bellamy
Drums, handclaps – Dan See
Electric bass – Dan Gulino
Mastered by – Stuart Hawkes
Producer (additional) – Will Bevan
Producer, mixed by, vocals, percussion (claps), programmed by – Jamie Woon
Recorded by (drums and bass) – Dan Clarke
Recorded by (vocals) – Austin Ince, Luke Buttery
Recorded by (vocals, assisted by) – Tristan Hackney
Vocals (choir) – Mae McKenna

Charts

Year-end charts

References

2010 singles
Jamie Woon songs
2010 songs
Polydor Records singles